Moving Target is the third studio album released by the Danish progressive metal band Royal Hunt.

Track listing
All songs written by André Andersen.
 "Last Goodbye" – 6:33
 "1348" – 4:32
 "Makin' a Mess" – 4:00
 "Far Away" – 4:58
 "Step by Step" – 5:11
 "Autograph" (Instrumental) – 3:36
 "Stay Down" – 4:21
 "Give It Up" – 4:01
 "Time" – 4:53
 "Far Away (acoustic) - 4:38 (bonus track for Japan)

Personnel
D. C. Cooper – lead and backing vocals
André Andersen – keyboards and guitars
Steen Mogensen – bass guitar
Jacob Kjaer – guitar
Kenneth Olsen – drums
with
Maria McTurk – backing vocals
Lise Hansen – backing vocals

References

External links
Heavy Harmonies page

Royal Hunt albums
1995 albums